The Boss' Wife is a 1986 American comedy film directed by Ziggy Steinberg and starring Daniel Stern, Arielle Dombasle and Christopher Plummer. It is about a young stockbroker who becomes enticed by the wife of his boss.

Plot
The wife (Arielle Dombasle) of the boss (Christopher Plummer) tries openly and avidly to seduce a married stockbroker (Daniel Stern) at a company function.

Cast
 Daniel Stern as Joel Keefer
 Arielle Dombasle as Louise Roalvang
 Fisher Stevens as Carlos Delgado
 Melanie Mayron as Janet Keefer
 Lou Jacobi as Harry Taphorn
 Martin Mull as Tony Dugdale
 Christopher Plummer as Mr. Roalvang
 Diane Stilwell as Suzy Dugdale
 Robert Costanzo as Eddie
 Jack Andreozzi as Doorman

External links

1986 films
1980s sex comedy films
American sex comedy films
1980s English-language films
Films scored by Bill Conti
TriStar Pictures films
1986 directorial debut films
1986 comedy films
1980s American films